Provorticidae is a family of flatworms belonging to the order Rhabdocoela.

Genera

Genera:
 Annulovortex Beklemischev, 1953
 Archivortex Reisinger, 1924
 Baicalellia Nasonov, 1930

References

Platyhelminthes